Vesiculovirus is a genus of negative-sense single-stranded RNA viruses in the family Rhabdoviridae, within the order Mononegavirales.

Taxonomy
The genus contains the following species:
Alagoas vesiculovirus
Carajas vesiculovirus
Chandipura vesiculovirus
Cocal vesiculovirus
Eptesicus vesiculovirus
Indiana vesiculovirus
Isfahan vesiculovirus
Jurona vesiculovirus
Malpais Spring vesiculovirus
Maraba vesiculovirus
Morreton vesiculovirus
New Jersey vesiculovirus
Perinet vesiculovirus
Piry vesiculovirus
Radi vesiculovirus
Rhinolophus vesiculovirus
Yug Bogdanovac vesiculovirus

References

External links 
 ViralZone: Vesiculovirus

Vesiculoviruses
Virus genera